"Tell that to the Marines" is a 1918 song, written during World War I. Jean Schwartz and Al Jolson composed the music; Harold Atteridge wrote the lyrics. Al Jolson performed an early version of the song. Based on sales estimates, it reached number two on the Top 100 US songs of its time.

The lyrics reference the catchphrase, Tell It to the Marines, and they address Kaiser Wilhelm directly.

Lyrics 
Do you remember, Kaiser Bill
About a year ago?
We told your old friend Bernstorff
That he better pack and go
You laughed and said
"America possessed no fighting stuff,"
Until our fighting Yankee boys
Walked in and called your bluff

That Monte Cristo idea will not do
If you think that the world belongs to you

Well, tell that to the Marines--
Those deviling hounds who know what fighting means
You are going to lick the world-- you said you will--
If you mean Uncle Sam, now listen Kaiser Bill:

Tell that to the Marines
The first to fight on all the fighting scenes
If you think you'll sink our new boat
With your damned old u-boat
Tell that to the Marines

That line of Hindenburg's would never break, you made a vow
It must be made of rubber, Bill
The way it's bending now
The Krupp works that you bragged about
You rave of them no more
We'll change them to the bankrupt works when we end up this war
So Kaiser Bill at warfare we are new
If you think now the Yankee drive is through
 

Well, tell that to the Marines
Those deviling hounds who know what fighting means
We are going to have six million men in line
Kaiser Bill, if you don't think they will cross the Rhine

Tell that to the Marines
The first to fight on all the fighting scenes
If you think the Yanks won't whirl-in
Right straight into Berlin
Tell that to the Marines!

References 

Songs about sailors
Songs about soldiers
Works about the United States Navy
1918 songs
Songs about Wilhelm II
Songs of World War I
Songs written by Al Jolson
Songs with music by Jean Schwartz
Songs with lyrics by Harold R. Atteridge
Al Jolson songs